Endeavour Energy is the operator of the electrical distribution network for Greater Western Sydney, the Blue Mountains, the Southern Highlands and the Illawarra region of NSW, Australia.

Background
It was formed from the previously state-owned energy retailer/supplier, Integral Energy, when the retail division of the company, along with the Integral Energy brand, was sold by the NSW Government in 2011 to Origin Energy.

In June 2017, an Australian-led consortium of institutional investors acquired 50.4% ownership of the rights to management of Endeavour Energy's network assets under a 99-year lease.

The consortium is  led by Macquarie Infrastructure and Real Assets (MIRA),  and includes AMP Capital, British Columbia Investment Management Corporation and Qatar Investment Authority.

The NSW Government retains a 49.6% interest and continues to regulate safety and reliability.

References 
Endeavour Network Map

Government-owned companies of New South Wales
Electric power distribution network operators in Australia